Gabriel Pereira dos Santos (born 1 August 2001), known as Gabriel Pereira or GP, is a Brazilian professional football player who plays as an attacking midfielder or winger for New York City.

Club career

Corinthians
Gabriel Pereira signed with Corinthians  youth squad.

Coming through the youth system, Gabriel made his professional debut for Corinthians in a 2020 Campeonato Brasileiro Série A away match against Atlético Mineiro on 13 August 2020.

New York City FC
On 17 March 2022, Pereira signed a four-year deal with Major League Soccer club New York City FC.

Honours
New York City FC
Campeones Cup: 2022

References

External links

2001 births
Living people
Brazilian footballers
Association football midfielders
Campeonato Brasileiro Série A players
Sport Club Corinthians Paulista players
Footballers from São Paulo
New York City FC players
Major League Soccer players